Hush 'N' Thunder is an album by multi-instrumentalist Yusef Lateef recorded in 1972 and released on the Atlantic label.

Reception

Allmusic awarded the album 4 stars with the review by Thom Jurek stating, "This album showcases Dr. Lateef heading for new musical frontiers as an interpreter and arranger and a deeply lyrical series of meditations on rhythm and melody".

Track listing 
 "Come Sunday" (Duke Ellington) - 2:34
 "The Hump" (Kenny Barron) - 4:45
 "Opus Part I / Opus Part II" (Barron) - 8:02
 "This Old Building" (Rev. Cleophus Robinson) - 2:42
 "Prayer" (Barron) - 3:05
 "Sunset" (Barron) - 7:53
 "His Eye Is on the Sparrow" (Traditional) - 5:34
 "Destination Paradise" (Lateef) - 3:49
Recorded in New York City on May 8, 1972 (track 7), May 10, 1972 (track 4), May 11, 1972  (track 1), May 18, 1972 (track 8),  September 25, 1972 (track 5) and September 26, 1972 (tracks 2, 3 & 6)

Personnel 
 Yusef Lateef - tenor saxophone, flute, shannai
 Kenny Barron - piano, electric piano
 Ray Bryant - piano (track 3)
 Cornell Dupree, Keith Loving, David Spinozza - guitar (track 8)
 Bob Cunningham (tracks 2, 3 & 6), Bill Salter (track 5) - bass
 Gordon Edwards - electric bass (tracks 8)
 Albert Heath - drums (tracks 2, 3 & 6)
 Al White - organ (tracks 4 & 7)
 The J.C. White Singers - vocals (tracks 4 & 7)
 Monroe "Bones" Constantino - vocals (tracks 3 & 5)
 Kermit Moore - cello (track 3)

References 

Yusef Lateef albums
1973 albums
Albums produced by Joel Dorn
Atlantic Records albums